Luang Pho Daeng was a Thai Buddhist monk who died while meditating in 1973.

Early life 
Luang was born in Thailand in 1894. He was briefly interested in becoming a monk in his 20s, but decided he would rather be married instead. He raised six children with his wife.

Later life 
After all of his children had grown, Luang (who was by now 50) decided to become a Buddhist monk, realizing his childhood dream. He was briefly an abbot at a temple in southern Thailand, but moved to  Wat Khunaram, near his childhood home. He practiced a life of Sokushinbutsu, a form of self mummification.

Death 
Luang died while meditating in 1973. His mummified body is on display at the Wat Khunaram (temple) on Ko Samui island in Thailand's Surat Thani Province. The mummy is notable for sporting a pair of sunglasses, placed by the caretakers to hide the decomposed eye sockets to make the display less disturbing. A native gecko species use the body as a hatchery, with eggs being laid beneath the skin.

See also 
 Buddhist mummies
 Sokushinbutsu

References

1973 deaths
Mummies
Place of birth missing
Thai Theravada Buddhist monks
1894 births